Le Ségur is a commune in the Tarn department and Occitanie region of southern France.

Geography
The river Cérou forms part of the commune's south-eastern border.

See also
Communes of the Tarn department

References

Communes of Tarn (department)